The 2700 and 2750 Classes (nicknamed "Sparrows" [Spanish Arrows]) were two related types of diesel multiple unit operated by Iarnród Éireann. The 2700 Class units were 2-car sets; 25 cars were built by GEC Alsthom in 1997 and 1998, and began entering service in December 1998.

History
From July 2004 to April 2005 they were used in six-piece sets on the Dublin-Rosslare InterCity services, before being replaced by newer units. The entire class was then based in Limerick, with one set outbased in Ballina to operate the Ballina - Manulla Junction shuttle, while it also operated an Athlone - Galway service on Fridays. A further set operated morning and evening Athenry - Galway commuter services during its layover from Limerick - Galway services. Otherwise the class operated all services from Limerick (save direct Limerick-Heuston trains) and services from Limerick Junction to Waterford.

They were capable of operation in consists of up to 10 cars. In addition to the 2-car units, two single car units were constructed. These units were classed as 2750 Class, and had a cab at each end so that they could operate either singly or as part of a set.

Even numbered cars had 62 seats while odd numbered cars contained 55 seats and a toilet. There were some exceptions however; the two 2750 Class units had 53 seats each, due to having cabs at both ends, while 2719 and 2721 had 50 seats each and included a bicycle storage area. The original black and orange Arrow livery was replaced by the newly introduced Commuter livery in 2004, upon the start of the sectorisation of Iarnród Éireann's operations.

In 2010, Iarnród Éireann began major overhauls of the 2700 and 2750 Classes, the most prominent feature of which was the removal of the end gangways, which had been unused for some time. This coincided with the addition of a new livery based on the 22000 Class colour scheme.

2716 suffered collision damage on 3 June 2000. Following repairs, it was coupled with 2609, part of the 2600 class.

In July 2012, the majority of the class was withdrawn and put into storage; by September 2012 the entire fleet had been withdrawn and was put up for sale. As of 2018, the entire 2700 fleet remains decommissioned at Inchicore Works in Dublin and in the sheds at Cork Kent.

In October 2017, Irish Rail put out to tender the reactivation and refurbishment of 10 2700 sets, which were due to re-enter service in early 2019 in order to free up ICR sets for busier Dublin area services. However, this plan was cancelled in 2018.

During 2022, the 2700s stored at Inchicore were removed from the rails and stored off-track to make more space for other rolling stock.

Fleet details

Models
Bachmann produced a model of 2715/2716 in Commuter livery. However, this was a repainted BR Class 158 rather than accurate tooling for the 2700 class.

References

External links

 Irish Rail Fleet Information page

Iarnród Éireann multiple units
Alstom multiple units
Train-related introductions in 1997